The 2022–23 season is the 114th season in the history of Levante UD and their first season back in the second division. The club are participating in Segunda División and the Copa del Rey.

Players 
.

Reserve team

Out on loan

Transfers

In

Out

Pre-season and friendlies

Competitions

Overall record

Segunda División

League table

Results summary

Results by round

Matches 
The league fixtures were announced on 23 June 2022.

Copa del Rey

References 

Levante UD seasons
Levante UD